Kamenka is a rural locality (a khutor) in Serpo-Molotskoye Rural Settlement, Novonikolayevsky District, Volgograd Oblast, Russia. The population was 169 as of 2010. There are 3 streets.

Geography 
Kamenka is located in steppe, on the Khopyorsko-Buzulukskaya Plain, 22 km south of Novonikolayevsky (the district's administrative centre) by road. Serp i Molot is the nearest rural locality.

References 

Rural localities in Novonikolayevsky District